State University of New York at Oswego (SUNY Oswego or Oswego State) is a public university in the City of Oswego and Town of Oswego, New York. It has two campuses: historic lakeside campus in Oswego and Metro Center in Syracuse, New York.

SUNY Oswego currently has over 80,000 living alumni. Oswego State offers more than 100 academic programs leading to bachelor's degrees, master's degrees, and certificates of advanced study. It consists of four colleges and schools: College of Liberal Arts and Sciences, School of Business, School of Education, and School of Communications, Media and the Arts.

History
SUNY Oswego was founded in 1861 as the Oswego Primary Teachers Training School by Edward Austin Sheldon, who introduced a revolutionary teaching methodology Oswego Movement in American education. In 1942 the New York Legislature elevated it from a normal school to a degree-granting teachers' college, Oswego State Teachers College, which was a founding and charter member of the State University of New York system in 1948. In 1962 the college broadened its scope to become a liberal arts college.

Campus

Founded in the city of Oswego by Sheldon to train teachers to meet pressing educational needs, the college moved to its current location on the shore of Lake Ontario in 1913 after Sheldon Hall was constructed. The current campus is located on  along Lake Ontario.  Development of the campus was planned by the architectural firm of Skidmore, Owings & Merrill, who designed the major buildings.

The campus today consists of 46 buildings with classrooms, laboratories, residential and athletic facilities. Recent years have witnessed the launch of a $700 million campus-wide renovation and renewal program, with the new Campus Center acting as the social hub of campus.

In the fall of 2013 the outdated Science and Mathematics building, Snygg Hall, was closed, and the new Richard S. Shineman Center for Science, Engineering and Innovation was opened to all STEM students: Science, Technology, Engineering, and Mathematics. The building, built onto the older Piez Hall, offers views of the college's Lakeside Community and Lake Ontario from the meteorology observation deck.

The college's social hub, known as the Marano Campus Center Complex, opened in the fall of 2007, and includes new construction and renovation of the existing Swetman/Poucher complex. The $25.5 million  Marano Campus Center portion, the new construction, includes the Deborah. F. Stanley Arena and Convocation Hall, food court, box office, fireplace lounge, breakfast nook and reservable spaces. The renovated portions of the building house The Compass (student services), The Point (student involvement), a student media center with WNYO, WTOP and The Oswegonian newspaper, Copy Center, and Freshëns Cafe. Academic departments in the Campus Center include English and creative writing, modern languages and literatures and philosophy, while the Office of Learning Services stands ready to assist students who need help outside the classroom. In addition, the College Honors Program is located in the Campus Center.

The Tyler Art Gallery
Tyler Art Gallery is located within the Tyler Hall. The gallery showcases local and traveling exhibitions, exhibitions of faculty work and student exhibitions. Tyler Art Gallery has a mission as a teaching gallery. The gallery serves as the training base for the museum studies program and allows students to be involved in the day-to-day operations of the gallery. The Student Art Exhibition Committee curate and have sole responsibility for the annual exhibition of student work. The gallery's permanent collection comprises European, African and American drawings, prints, paintings, ceramics and sculpture that date from the 18th century to the present, including several works by artist Sacha Kolin. One subsection of the permanent collection, the Grant Arnold Collection of Fine Prints, contains over 500 prints by American printmakers from the first half of the twentieth century. Tyler Hall is in the process of significant renovations, with the first phase completed for a fall 2016 reopening.

Other buildings

Physically separate from the main campus, on the other side of New York State Route 104, is the south campus, consisting of Laker Hall (indoor sports, coaching classrooms, and athletic training rooms), Romney Fieldhouse (a Quonset hut that hosted the Laker hockey program until fall 2006) and several athletic fields.

West Campus, along with Laker Hall, Hewitt Hall (which hosted most of the student organizations until the Campus Center's opening in 2006), Tyler Hall, Culkin Hall (the administrative building), Penfield Library, Lanigan Hall (consisting of large lecture halls) and Mahar Hall are all built in the Brutalist style and date to the early 1970s.

On Campus residences 
A variety of living options are available through 13 residences:
 Lakeside Area: Scales, Waterbury, Riggs and Johnson Halls. Riggs, Scales, Waterbury and Johnson were recently renovated; the latter is the home to the First-Year Residential Experience.
 West Campus, formerly called "New Campus": Cayuga, Seneca, Oneida and Onondaga Halls. Onondaga Hall was constructed in a suite style, allowing communal living of up to six students per suite.
 Main Campus: Hart Hall Global Living and Learning Center, Funnelle Hall, Sheldon Hall
 Mackin Complex: Lonis and Moreland Halls, located in the city of Oswego across the street from Sheldon Hall. Lonis consists of single occupancy rooms for upperclassmen, while Moreland is the traditional double occupancy dorm style for all class standings.
 The Village: Due to a shortage in residential rooms in Fall 2008 caused by higher than expected enrollment and on-campus living requests than expected, several rooms were offered in renovated conference/hotel space in Sheldon Hall. The Village, a new townhouse village with apartment living was constructed south of Glimmerglass Lagoon, and opened in the fall 2010 semester.

It often has served as the residence for the college president throughout the years.

Accreditations
Middle States accredited with additional accreditations. The institution's MBA program has been internationally accredited by AACSB. SUNY Oswego's School of Education is accredited by the Council for the Accreditation of Educator Preparation. Oswego's School of Business has international accreditation by the Association to Advance Collegiate Schools of Business. SUNY Oswego is one of the few colleges in New York state whose art, music, and theater departments are all nationally accredited.

Schools and colleges
 College of Liberal Arts and Sciences houses the departments of Anthropology, Atmospheric and Geological Sciences, Biology, Chemistry, Computer Science, Economics, Electrical and Computer Engineering, English and Creative Writing, History, Human Development, Mathematics, Modern Languages and Literatures, Philosophy, Physics, Political Science, Psychology, Criminal Justice, Sociology
 School of Business offers programs in Accounting, Business Administration, Finance, Human Resource Management, Marketing, Operations Management and Information Systems, Risk Management and Insurance.
 School of Communication, Media and the Arts houses the departments of Art, Communication Studies, Film Studies, Music, Theatre.
 School of Education offers courses in Counseling and Psychological Services, Curriculum and Instruction, Education Administration, Health Promotion and Wellness, Technology, Vocational Teacher Preparation.

Library 
Penfield Library is the main academic library on campus. It is named after Lida S. Penfield (1873–1956), once chair of the English department. The current  facility opened in 1968, replacing a library of the same name in what is now Rich Hall. The library is home to the Millard Fillmore and Marshall Family Papers and numerous digitized collections including the Fort Ontario Emergency Refugee Shelter (Safe Haven) papers.

Athletics
The university offers 24 intercollegiate varsity sports. SUNY Oswego's athletic teams are known officially as the Great Lakers but often referred to simply as the Lakers. Oswego is a member of NCAA Division III and teams compete in the State University of New York Athletic Conference for most sports. Women's ice hockey plays in the ECAC West, as that sport is not offered by the SUNYAC.

Oswego is traditionally a rival of Plattsburgh State. The rivalry currently manifests mostly in ice hockey; in the 1990s and early 2000s, Oswego fans would regularly throw bagels onto the ice when the Lakers scored against Plattsburgh, responding to a tradition where Plattsburgh fans threw tennis balls on the rink after goals versus Oswego. The tradition ended in 2006, after Oswego was assessed a delay of game penalty for the bagel throw: Plattsburgh scored on the ensuing power-play to win the game, which cost the Lakers a national tournament berth. In addition, the Campus Center arena was opened that year which allowed the university to more closely monitor and shut down fans who brought in bagels. The "Puck Flattsburgh" spoonerism is a common rallying cry. Oswego and Plattsburgh also had a rivalry in football, but Oswego ceased sponsoring the sport in 1976, with Plattsburgh following in 1978.

Oswego also has a running rivalry with Cortland State in Women's Field Hockey. The teams play annually for the "Dragon Sword" trophy, donated by Oswego alumni Michael and Kimberlee (Bennett) Champitto in 1999. As of 2021, Oswego has never won the sword.

Men's
 Baseball
 Basketball
 Cross country
 Golf
 Ice hockey
 Indoor track and field
 Lacrosse
 Outdoor track and field
 Soccer
 Swimming and diving
 Tennis
 Wrestling

Women's
 Ice hockey
 Basketball
 Cross country
 Field hockey
 Indoor track and field
 Lacrosse
 Outdoor track and field
 Soccer
 Softball
 Swimming and diving
 Tennis
 Volleyball

National championships
On March 18, 2007, the Oswego State men's ice hockey team won the 2006–07 NCAA Division III ice hockey National Championship, the first NCAA championship ever for the school.

Clubs and student organizations
Oswego has over 180 clubs and organizations, many funded by the Student Association. These include: the Division I Men's Rugby team, the student-run television station WTOP, the student-run newspaper The Oswegonian, the first-ever student-run volunteer ambulance corps (SAVAC), a collegiate-level synchronized skating team,  the student-run radio station WNYO-FM, nationally competitive cheerleading, community service clubs, political organizations, the Shaun Cassidy Fan Club Improv Comedy Troupe, club baseball, and Oswego Women's Rugby. There are also groups that appeal to those with specific interests or hobbies, such as ALANA which includes the Black Student Union, the Latino Student Union, the Asian Student Association, the Caribbean Student Association and the African Student Organization. Other groups include the Financial Management Association, the Investment Club, the Christian groups BASIC (Brothers and Sisters in Christ) and CCM (Christian Campus Ministries), the Oswego State Pagan Association, a Muslim Student Association, the Pride Alliance (formerly the Rainbow Alliance; SUNY Oswego's only LGBT organization), the theater group Blackfriars, the Story Tellers' Guild (anime, geek, and gamer club), Oswego State Esports Association (formally the League of Legends Club: featuring competitive teams in League of Legends, Super Smash Bros. Ultimate, Overwatch, Hearthstone and Pokémon), Chess Club, the Pro-Wrestling Club (PWC), College Republicans, and the local chapter of the American Society for Information Science and Technology.

Greek organizations
Oswego has an array of Greek organizations (fraternities, sororities, or mixed) from both national and locally recognized chapters.  Each semester, eligible students can "rush" a Greek organization of their choice.

Fraternities

 Kappa Sigma
 Theta Chi
 Delta Kappa Kappa (DKK)
 Delta Sigma Phi
 Zeta Chi Zeta
 Lambda Sigma Upsilon
 Psi Phi Gamma
 Phi Beta Sigma
 Sigma Alpha Epsilon
 Tau Kappa Epsilon
 Phi Iota Alpha 
Mu Beta Psi
 Alpha Phi Omega (APO)
 Sigma Tau Chi
 Sigma Gamma
 Lambda Upsilon Lambda

Sororities
 Alpha Delta Eta
 Alpha Epsilon Phi
 Alpha Sigma Chi
 Omega Phi Beta
 Omicron Xi
 Phi Lambda Phi
 Phi Sigma Sigma
 Sigma Delta Tau
 Sigma Lambda Upsilon
 Mu Sigma Upsilon
 Delta Phi Epsilon
 Kappa Delta Phi N.A.S.

Other Greek organizations
 Alpha Phi Omega, national service fraternity (co-ed)
 Beta Alpha Psi, accounting/finance/information systems honor society (co-ed)
 Beta Beta Beta, national biological sciences honor society (co-ed) 
 Beta Gamma Sigma, international AACSB business honor society (co-ed)
 Delta Phi Alpha, the national German honorary society for outstanding students of the German language (Nationale Deutsche Ehrenverbindung; Oswego Chapter: Zeta Xi, 1967)
 Lambda Pi Eta, national communications honor society (co-ed)
 Mu Beta Psi, national honorary musical fraternity (co-ed)
 Omicron Delta Epsilon, national economics honor society (co-ed)
 Omicron Delta Kappa, national leadership honor society
 Phi Kappa Phi, national all-disciplinary honorary society of academic excellence
 Pi Delta Phi, the national French honor Society for academic excellence in French (Oswego Chapter: Theta Delta, 1975)
 Pi Sigma Alpha, national political science honor society
 Psi Chi, national honor society in psychology
 Phi Alpha Theta, national honor society in history

Traditions

 Bridge Street Run – The Bridge Street Run is a pub crawl that now takes place during the spring semester on the last Friday before finals week. Students put on white T-shirts, start at the Front Door Tavern on East 10th and Utica Streets, and make their way down Bridge Street (New York State Route 104) in Oswego. They stop at all participating bars along the way on or within a block of Bridge Street to have their shirts signed. The event has been a tradition in various forms at SUNY Oswego for over 30 years.  The college officially discourages the practice. It was finally banned by the city in 2014 following a students death caused by a heroin overdose on campus; the following year, the college set up OzFest, a campus festival, to deter partiers from participating in the Bridge Street Run. However, students still continue the tradition each spring.

Presidents 

 Deborah F. Stanley (10th) 1995-2021
 Stephen L. Weber (9th) 1988-1995
 Virginia Radley 1977-1988
 James E. Perdue 1965-1977
 Foster S. Brown 1952-1963
 Harvey M. Rice 1947-1952
 Ralph W. Swetman 1933-1947
 James C. Riggs 1913-1933
 Isaac B. Poucher 1897-1913
 Edward Austin Sheldon 1861-1897

Notable faculty
Soma Mei Sheng Frazier, author, editor:SUBNIVEAN  Creative Writing Assistant Professor, somafrazier
Doug Lea, current Interim Chair of Computer Science
 Roy Lichtenstein, pop artist; taught in the Art Department 1958–1960
 Sir Kenneth O. Hall, Governor-General of Jamaica (Feb 2006 – Feb 2009); served as Assistant Provost and Professor of History at Oswego
 Robert O'Connor, Associate Professor in Creative Writing Department; author of Buffalo Soldiers
 Leigh Allison Wilson, author and Creative Writing professor

Notable alumni

Actor Al Lewis claimed that he attended the school from 1927 to 1931. Most of Lewis's claims about his early life are widely considered to be untrue.

References

External links
Official website

 
1861 establishments in New York (state)
Education in Oswego County, New York
Oswego, New York
Oswego
Oswego
Tourist attractions in Oswego County, New York
Universities and colleges in Syracuse, New York
Rugby union teams in New York (state)